Love Is Alive: Works of 1985–2010 is a compilation album by American singer-songwriter Eric Martin. The album was released on November 8, 2010 exclusively in Japan by Sony Music Japan to commemorate the 25th anniversary of Martin's solo career.

The album peaked at No. 138 on Oricon's albums chart.

Track listing

Charts

References

External links
 
  

2010 compilation albums
Eric Martin (musician) albums
Sony Music Entertainment Japan compilation albums